The 17th Northwest Territories Legislative Assembly was established by the results of the 2011 Northwest Territories general election on October 3, 2011. It was the 25th sitting of the Assembly in the territory's history. The Assembly was dissolved in 2015.

Term extension debate
Members voted on Motion 16-17(5) introduced by Hay River North MLA Jane Groenewegen to extend the term of the Assembly to five years starting with the 18th Legislature to match every other provincial and territorial jurisdiction in Canada. This change was approved by the federal government. In addition they voted to ask for permission of the federal government to extend the current mandate of the Assembly to postpone the 23rd general election and sit until October 2016. The reason given was to avoid having an election during federal election and municipal elections in the territory scheduled at the same time, claiming voters will be fatigued. The decision by council prompted a petition calling for the Assembly to be dissolved early.

The motion passed the legislature on a recorded vote with 11 members for and 7 against with one member absent

Number of MLAs in the capital city 
Currently, 7 of 19 of the Assembly's representatives are from the capital city of Yellowknife. The City of Yellowknife is launching a lawsuit to increase the number of Yellowknife-based MLAs to something more closely in line with the city's roughly 50 per cent of the NWT population. However, some say increasing the number of Yellowknife-based MLAs would weaken the territories on the whole.

Membership
A total of nineteen members were returned to council in the 2015 general election. Three members were acclaimed to office on September 9, 2011 with the rest in contested districts being returned on October 3, 2011.

Standings and cabinet changes

References

External links
 Legislative Assembly of the Northwest Territories